Benjamin Obadiah Iqbal Zephaniah (born 15 April 1958) is a British writer and dub poet. He was included in The Times list of Britain's top 50 post-war writers in 2008.

Early life and education
Zephaniah was born and raised in the Handsworth district of Birmingham, England, which he has called the "Jamaican capital of Europe". He is the son of a Barbadian postman and a Jamaican nurse. A dyslexic, he attended an approved school but left aged 13 unable to read or write. During his childhood he was given an old, manual typewriter which he says inspired him to become a writer. It is now in the collection of Birmingham Museums Trust.

He writes that his poetry is strongly influenced by the music and poetry of Jamaica and what he calls "street politics". His first performance was in church when he was eleven, and by the age of 15, his poetry was already known among Handsworth's Afro-Caribbean and Asian communities.

As a young man, he received a criminal record and served a prison sentence for burglary. Tired of the limitations of being a black poet communicating with black people only, he decided to expand his audience, and headed to London at the age of 22.

While living in London, Zephaniah was caught up in the 1980s race riots and experienced racism on a regular basis:"They happened around me. Back then, racism was very in your face. There was the National Front against black and foreign people and the police were also very racist. I got stopped four times after I bought a BMW when I became successful with poetry. I kept getting stopped by the police so I sold it."

Written work and poetry
Zephaniah became actively involved in a workers' co-operative in Stratford, London, which led to the publication of his first book of poetry, Pen Rhythm (Page One Books, 1980). Three editions were published. Zephaniah has said that his mission is to fight the dead image of poetry in academia, and to "take [it] everywhere" to people who do not read books, so he turned poetry readings into concert-like performances.

His second collection of poetry, The Dread Affair: Collected Poems (1985), contained a number of poems attacking the British legal system. Rasta Time in Palestine (1990), an account of a visit to the Palestinian occupied territories, contained poetry and travelogue.

Zephaniah was poet in residence at the chambers of Michael Mansfield QC, and sat in on the inquiry into Bloody Sunday and other cases, these experiences leading to his Too Black, Too Strong poetry collection (2001). We Are Britain! (2002) is a collection of poems celebrating cultural diversity in Britain.

Zephaniah's first book of poetry for children, called Talking Turkeys (1994), was reprinted after six weeks. In 1999, he wrote a novel for teenagers, Face, the first of four novels to date.

In May 2011, Zephaniah accepted a year-long position as poet-in-residence at Keats House in Hampstead, London, his first residency role for more than ten years. Accepting the role, he commented: "I don't do residencies, but Keats is different. He's a one-off, and he has always been one of my favourite poets."

In 2016, Zephaniah wrote the foreword to Angry White People: Coming face-to-face with the British far right by Hsiao-Hung Pai.

His frank autobiography The Life And Rhymes of Benjamin Zephaniah was published to coincide with his 60th birthday in 2018, when BBC Sounds broadcast him reading his own text. “I’m still as angry as I was in my twenties,” he says. The Birmingham Mail has dubbed him “The people’s laureate”.

Acting and television
Zephaniah has made minor appearances in several TV programmes in the 1980s and 1990s, including The Bill (1994), The Comic Strip Presents... (1994) and Crucial Tales (1996).

In 1990, he appeared in the film Farendj, directed by Sabine Prenczina and starring Tim Roth.

Between 2013 and 2022, Zephaniah played the role of preacher Jeremiah "Jimmy" Jesus in BBC drama Peaky Blinders, appearing in 14 episodes across the 6 series.

In 2020, he appeared as a panellist on the BBC television show QI, on the episode "Roaming".

Music
In 1982, Zephaniah released the album Rasta, which featured the Wailers' first recording since the death of Bob Marley as well as a tribute to the political prisoner (later to become South African president) Nelson Mandela. The album gained him international prestige and topped the Yugoslavian pop charts. It was because of this recording that he was introduced to Mandela, and in 1996, Mandela requested that Zephaniah host the president's Two Nations Concert at the Royal Albert Hall, London.

Views

Animal rights and veganism
Zephaniah became a vegetarian at age 11, and then became a vegan at the age of 13 when he read poems about "shimmering fish floating in an underwater paradise, and birds flying free in the clear blue sky".

Zephaniah is an honorary patron of The Vegan Society, Viva! (Vegetarians' International Voice for Animals), and EVOLVE! Campaigns, and is an animal rights advocate. In 2004, he wrote the foreword to Keith Mann's book From Dusk 'til Dawn: An insider's view of the growth of the Animal Liberation Movement, a book about the Animal Liberation Front. In August 2007, he announced that he would be launching the Animal Liberation Project, alongside People for the Ethical Treatment of Animals.

In February 2001, Zephaniah published The Little Book of Vegan Poems.

Anti-racism activism
Zephaniah has spoken extensively about his personal experiences of anti-Black racism in Britain and has incorporated his experiences in much of his written work.

In 2012, Zephaniah has worked with anti-racism organisation Newham Monitoring Project, with whom he made a video, and Tower Hamlets Summer University about the impact of Olympic policing on black communities.

Other activism
In 2003, Zephaniah was offered appointment as an Officer of the Order of the British Empire, but publicly rejected the honour. In a subsequent article for The Guardian he elaborated upon his reaction to learning about being considered for the award and his reasons for rejecting it: "Me? I thought, OBE me? Up yours, I thought. I get angry when I hear that word 'empire'; it reminds me of slavery, it reminds of thousands of years of brutality, it reminds me of how my foremothers were raped and my forefathers brutalised... Benjamin Zephaniah OBE – no way Mr Blair, no way Mrs Queen. I am profoundly anti-empire."

Zephaniah has spoken in favour of a British Republic and the dis-establishment of the crown. In 2015 he called for Welsh and Cornish to be taught in English schools, saying: "Hindi, Chinese and French are taught [in schools], so why not Welsh? And why not Cornish? They're part of our culture."

In 2012, Zephaniah joined Amnesty International in speaking out against homophobia in Jamaica, saying: "For many years Jamaica was associated with freedom fighters and liberators, so it hurts when I see that the home of my parents is now associated with the persecution of people because of their sexual orientation."

In 2016, Zephaniah curated We Are All Human, an exhibition at the Southbank Centre presented by the Koestler Trust which exhibited art works by prisoners, detainees and ex-offenders.

Zephaniah is a supporter of the Palestine Solidarity Campaign and has joined demonstrations calling for an end to the Israeli occupation of Palestinian lands, describing the activism as the "Anti Apartheid movement". He is also a supporter of the BDS (Boycott, Divestment and Sanctions) movement.

Political views
Zephaniah self-identifies as an anarchist. He appeared in literature to support changing the British electoral system from first-past-the-post to alternative vote for electing members of parliament to the House of Commons in the Alternative Vote referendum in 2011. In a 2017 interview, commenting on the ongoing Brexit negotiations, Zephaniah stated that "For left-wing reasons, I think we should leave the EU but the way that we're leaving is completely wrong".

In December 2019, along with 42 other leading cultural figures, Zephaniah signed a letter endorsing the Labour Party under Jeremy Corbyn's leadership in the 2019 general election. The letter stated that "Labour's election manifesto under Jeremy Corbyn's leadership offers a transformative plan that prioritises the needs of people and the planet over private profit and the vested interests of a few."

Achievements

Zephaniah won the BBC Young Playwright's Award. He has been awarded honorary doctorates by the University of North London (in 1998), the University of Central England (in 1999), Staffordshire University (in 2001), London South Bank University (in 2003), the University of Exeter and the University of Westminster (in 2006).

On 17 July 2008, Zephaniah received an honorary doctorate from the University of Birmingham. He was listed at 48 in The Times list of 50 greatest postwar writers.

He has released several albums of original music. He was awarded Best Original Song in the Hancocks 2008, Talkawhile Awards for Folk Music (as voted by members of Talkawhile.co.uk) for his version of Tam Lyn Retold recorded with The Imagined Village. He collected the Award live at The Cambridge Folk Festival on 2 August 2008 and described himself as a "Rasta Folkie".

Personal life
Zephaniah lived for many years in East London but in 2008 began dividing his time between a village near Spalding, Lincolnshire and Beijing in China. He is a keen language learner and has studied Mandarin Chinese for over a decade.

He was married for twelve years to Amina, a theatre administrator, whom he divorced in 2001.

In May 2018, in an interview of BBC Radio Five Live, Zephaniah admitted that he had been violent to a former partner, confessing to having hit her. During the admission, he said: "The way I treated some of my girlfriends was terrible. At one point I was violent. I was never like one of these persons who have a girlfriend, who'd constantly beat them, but I could lose my temper sometimes."

"There was one girlfriend that I had, and I actually hit her a couple of times, and as I got older I really regretted it. It burned my conscience so badly. It really ate at me, you know. And I'm a meditator. It got in the way of my meditation."Zephaniah's family were Christian but he became a Rastafari at a young age. He gave up smoking cannabis in his thirties.

He is a supporter of Aston Villa F.C. and is the patron for an Aston Villa supporters' website.

Books

Poetry
 Pen Rhythm (1980)
 The Dread Affair: Collected Poems (1985), Arena
 City Psalms (1992), Bloodaxe Books
 Inna Liverpool (1992), AK Press
 Talking Turkeys (1994), Puffin Books
 Propa Propaganda (1996), Bloodaxe Books
 Funky Chickens (1997), Puffin
 School's Out: Poems Not for School (1997), AK Press
 Funky Turkeys (Audiobook) (1999), AB hntj
 White Comedy (Unknown)
 Wicked World! (2000), Puffin
 Too Black, Too Strong (2001), Bloodaxe Books
 The Little Book of Vegan Poems (2001), AK Press
 Reggae Head (Audiobook), 57 Productions

Novels
 Face (1999), Bloomsbury (published in children's and adult editions)
 Refugee Boy (2001), Bloomsbury
 Gangsta Rap (2004), Bloomsbury
 Teacher's Dead (2007), Bloomsbury
 Terror Kid (2014), Bloomsbury

Biographies
 We Sang Across the Sea: The Empire Windrush and Me (2022), a biography of Mona Baptiste written by Zephaniah and illustrated by Onyinye Iwu.

Children's books
 We are Britain (2002), Frances Lincoln Publishers
 Primary Rhyming Dictionary (2004), Chambers Harrap
 J is for Jamaica (2006), Frances Lincoln
 My Story (2011), Collins
 When I Grow Up (2011), Frances Lincoln

Other
 Kung Fu Trip (2011), Bloomsbury
 The Life And Rhymes of Benjamin Zephaniah (2018), Simon & Schuster

Plays
 Playing the Right Tune (1985)
 Job Rocking (1987). Published in Black Plays: 2, ed. Yvonne Brewster, Methuen Drama, 1989.
 Delirium (1987)
 Streetwise (1990)
 Mickey Tekka (1991)
 Listen to Your Parents (included in Theatre Centre: Plays for Young People – Celebrating 50 Years of Theatre Centre (2003) Aurora Metro, also published by Longman, 2007)
 Face: The Play (with Richard Conlon)

Acting roles
 Didn't You Kill My Brother? (1987) – Rufus
 Farendj (1989) – Moses
 Dread Poets' Society (1992) – Andy Wilson
 Truth or Dairy (1994) – The Vegan Society (UK)
 Crucial Tales (1996) – Richard's father
 Making the Connection (2010) – Environment Films / The Vegan Society (UK)
 Peaky Blinders (2013–2022) – Jeremiah Jesus

Discography

Albums
 Rasta (1982) Upright (reissued 1989) Workers Playtime (UK Indie #22)
 Us An Dem (1990) Island
 Back to Roots (1995) Acid Jazz
 Belly of De Beast (1996) Ariwa
 Naked (2005) One Little Indian
 Naked & Mixed-Up (2006) One Little Indian (Benjamin Zephaniah Vs. Rodney-P)
 Revolutionary Minds (2017) Fane Productions

Singles, EPs
 Dub Ranting EP (1982) Radical Wallpaper
 "Big Boys Don't Make Girls Cry" 12-inch single (1984) Upright
 "Free South Africa" (1986)
 "Crisis" 12-inch single (1992) Workers Playtime

Guest appearances
 "Empire" (1995) Bomb the Bass with Zephaniah & Sinéad O'Connor
 Heading for the Door by Back to Base (2000) MPR Records
 Open Wide (2004) Dubioza kolektiv (C) & (P) Gramofon
 Rebel by Toddla T (2009) 1965 Records
 "Illegal" (2000) from "Himawari" by Swayzak
 "Theatricks" (2000) by Kinobe

See also
 List of animal rights advocates

References

External links

 
 
 
 Merope Mills, "Rasta poet publicly rejects his OBE", The Guardian, 27 November 2003.
 Benjamin Zephaniah – from The Black Presence in Britain
 Benjamin Zephaniah on Poetry, Politics and Revolution – video report by Democracy Now!

1958 births
English people of Barbadian descent
English people of Jamaican descent
20th-century English poets
English Rastafarians
People from Birmingham, West Midlands
British republicans
Black British musicians
Black British writers
British people convicted of burglary
Living people
English male poets
21st-century English poets
21st-century English male writers
Dub poets
English male dramatists and playwrights
20th-century English dramatists and playwrights
21st-century British dramatists and playwrights
British Eurosceptics
20th-century English male writers
People from Handsworth, West Midlands
Acid Jazz Records artists
Writers with dyslexia
Musicians with dyslexia
British veganism activists